Fernando Vega may refer to:

 Fernando Vega (athlete) (born 1998), Mexican hurdler 
 Fernando Vega (footballer, born 1984), Spanish defender
 Fernando Vega (footballer, born 1995), Argentine midfielder
 Fernando Vega (painter) (1932–1965), Peruvian painter; married to Janine Pommy Vega